The 1962 Columbia Lions football team was an American football team that represented Columbia University during the 1962 NCAA University Division football season. Columbia tied for third in the Ivy League. 

In their sixth season under head coach Aldo "Buff" Donelli, the Lions compiled a 5–4 record but were outscored 206 to 124. Thomas E. O’Connor Jr. was the team captain.  

The Lions' 2–3 conference record tied for third in the Ivy League standings. Columbia was outscored 169 to 96 by Ivy opponents. 

Columbia played its home games at Baker Field in Upper Manhattan, in New York City.

Schedule

References

Columbia
Columbia Lions football seasons
Columbia Lions football